Zacharias Pantelakos (22 October 1759 – 20 July 1804), nicknamed Barbitsiotis but more commonly known as Kapetan Zacharias, was a Greek klepht in the Peloponnese during the last decades of Ottoman rule over Greece. He is described by Kyriakos Kassis as the best klepht of Taygetus.

Early life and career

Zacharias "Barbitsiotis" Pantelakos was born on 22 October 1759 in the town of Varvitsa, Laconia, though his family originated from Mani. His father's name was Theodoros and his mother's name was unknown. In 1775, his brother Pantelis, was murdered by the Turks. Zacharias, wanting revenge, went to the town of Loggastra in northern Laconia where he joined a band of klephts under the command of kapetan (chieftain) Mantzaris.

The next year during the Battle of Rekitsas, Zacharias charged at the Turks without orders. The other klephts followed him and they chased after the Turks. This incident won Zacharias recognition from his comrades for his bravery. However, Mantzaris was angry with Zacharias as he had not followed orders and Zacharias left and founded his own group of sixty men under his own flag.

Rise to power

Zacharios' fame grew even more when he defeated the Turks at the Battle of Salesi in Arcadia. A. Kontakis, who was the leader of the village of Agios Petros in Arcadia, and who at first an enemy and later a friend of Zacharias described in his memoirs:

In 1787, Zacharias invited all the chieftains of the bands of klephts in the Peloponnese to a meeting, and they formed a klepht-armatoloi federation. This federation brought more power to Zacharias who was made the commander-in-chief of the federation. Meanwhile, he had constructed his own fortress in the mountains of Mani, and from there he launched his raids on the Turks. It was widely thought that Zacharias' aim was for the Turks to meet his demands, however, in reality what he wanted was the liberation of the Peloponnese from the Turks.

Meanwhile, the klepht Andreas Androutsos (father of Odysseas Androutsos), was expelled by the Turks from his base in Aegina and escaped on the ship of Lambros Katsonis. They landed in Mani, where they were greeted by Zacharias and a young Theodoros Kolokotronis (a future Greek hero of whom Zacharias would be his mentor) and took him in his band.

Death

In 1804, the Turks extended their efforts to capture Zacharias as well as the former Bey of Mani, Tzanetos Grigorakis, who retreated to the mountains after being deposed and after the events of the 1803 Ottoman Invasion of Mani. The reason for this increased interest into Zacharias' capture was because it had been revealed that together with Tzanetos and other prominent Maniots, he had been conspiring with Napoleon Bonaparte, who had sent them French weapons. In charge of the attempt to capture Zacharias was Seremet, who had been instructed to capture Zacharias and hand him over to the higher authorities.

Seremet, knowing that capturing Zacharias without any casualties was nearly impossible, decided to assassinate him. The Turks approached a Maniot by the name of Koukeas and organised the assassination attempt with him. Koukeas went to Zacharias and told him that a Turkish fleet had appeared off Kitries. When Zacharias went to investigate this himself, he was assassinated near Kardamyli.

References

Sources
Kyriakos Kassis, (1979). Mani's History. Athens: Presoft
 

1759 births
1804 deaths
Maniots
Greek revolutionaries
18th-century Greek people
19th-century Greek people
Greeks from the Ottoman Empire
Assassinated Greek people
People from Laconia